Grizzly Peak in Yosemite Valley is a promontory on the southwest wall below the popular Half Dome. It can be seen on the hike to Vernal Fall and Nevada Fall, from northeastern Glacier Point, and various other locations in the Yosemite Valley. The top is not accessible by any trail, although rock climbers frequent the peak.

References

Mountains of Yosemite National Park
Mountains of Mariposa County, California
Mountains of Northern California